Group C of the 1993 Federation Cup Americas Zone was one of four pools in the Americas zone of the 1993 Federation Cup. Five teams competed in a round robin competition, with the top two teams advancing to the play-offs.

Chile vs. Dominican Republic

Venezuela vs. Jamaica

Chile vs. Venezuela

Ecuador vs. Dominican Republic

Venezuela vs. Dominican Republic

Ecuador vs. Jamaica

Chile vs. Jamaica

Venezuela vs. Ecuador

Chile vs. Ecuador

Jamaica vs. Dominican Republic

See also
Fed Cup structure

References

External links
 Fed Cup website

1993 Federation Cup Americas Zone